Bézenet is a commune in the Allier department in central France.

Geography 
Bézenet is part of the canton of Commentry (before March 2015: canton of Montmarault) and of the Commentry Montmarault Néris Communauté.

Population

See also
Communes of the Allier department

References

Communes of Allier
Allier communes articles needing translation from French Wikipedia